NACCO Industries, Inc. is an American publicly traded holding company, headquartered in Cleveland, Ohio. Through a portfolio of mining and natural resources businesses, the company operates under three business segments: Coal Mining, North American Mining, and Minerals Management. The Coal Mining segment operates surface coal mines under long-term contracts with power generation companies and an activated carbon producer pursuant to a service-based business model. The North American Mining segment provides value-added contract mining and other services for producers of aggregates, lithium, and other minerals. The Minerals Management segment promotes the development of the Company’s oil, gas, and coal reserves, generating income primarily from royalty-based lease payments from third parties. In addition, the Company has a business providing stream and wetland mitigation solutions.

History 

NACCO Industries originated in 1913 with the incorporation of the Cleveland and Western Coal Company. The name was changed to The North American Coal Corporation (NACCO) in 1925, and the company operated exclusively in the coal industry until the acquisition of Yale Materials Handling Corporation in 1985. This was followed in 1986 by creation of the holding company under the name NACCO Industries, Inc. NACCO Industries expanded into housewares with the purchase of Proctor Silex in 1988 and Hamilton Beach in 1990, and expanded its presence in the materials handling industry by adding the Hyster Company in 1989. Yale Materials Handling Corporation and the Hyster Company were combined to form Hyster-Yale Materials Handling, which was spun off in 2012. In 2017, NACCO spun off Hamilton Beach Brands and Kitchen Collections.

References

External links 

 

Holding companies of the United States
Companies listed on the New York Stock Exchange
Holding companies established in 1913
Coal companies of the United States
Forklift truck manufacturers
Retail companies of the United States
Companies based in Cleveland
Conglomerate companies of the United States
1913 establishments in Ohio
Non-renewable resource companies established in 1913
Home appliance manufacturers of the United States
American companies established in 1913